Zack Moore is an American football coach and former player. He is defensive coordinator at Morehead State University.  Moore served at the head football coach at Kentucky Christian University from 2009 to 2010, compiling a record of 1–21.  He was head football coach at East Carter High School in Grayson, Kentucky from 2011 to 2014.

Head coaching record

College

References

External links
 Morehead State profile

Year of birth missing (living people)
Living people
American football linebackers
Kentucky Christian Knights football coaches
Morehead State Eagles football coaches
Morehead State Eagles football players
High school football coaches in Kentucky